Sir Nicolas Cheetham  (8 October 1910 – 14 January 2002) was a British diplomat and writer.

Career
Nicolas John Alexander Cheetham (son of Sir Milne Cheetham, also a diplomat) was educated at Eton College and Christ Church, Oxford. He entered the Diplomatic Service in 1934 and served at Athens, Buenos Aires, Mexico City and Vienna.

In 1948 Cheetham, in charge of the Allied Control Commission in Vienna, attended a meeting of the Anglo-Russian Society to commemorate the 30th anniversary of the Red Army. The Soviet commander-in-chief, General Vladimir Kurasov, made a speech claiming that Britain and the USA had helped Hitler to prepare for war against the Soviet Union, and were plotting a war themselves. Cheetham and the American envoy, Sidney Mellon, got up and walked out. Afterwards, in answer to a question in the House of Commons, the Foreign Secretary, Ernest Bevin, said that the Government fully endorsed Cheetham's action. (Cheetham's obituary in The Daily Telegraph recalled that "he attracted attention with another walkout from a party, when President Nkrumah of Ghana called Britain 'a colonialist oppressor'.")

Cheetham was Minister to Hungary 1959–61, Assistant Under-Secretary at the Foreign Office 1961–64, and Ambassador to Mexico 1964–68.

After retiring from the Diplomatic Service, Cheetham wrote historical books.

Family
In 1936, he married Jean Evison Corfe, daughter of Lt.-Col. Arthur Cecil Corfe. They had two sons (one of whom is publisher Anthony Cheetham). After a divorce, Cheetham married in 1960 Lady Mabel Kathleen Jocelyn (1915–1985), daughter of the 8th Earl of Roden and former wife of Sir Richard Brooke, 10th Baronet (who himself remarried Cheetham's former wife).

Honours
Cheetham was appointed CMG in the New Year Honours of 1953 and knighted KCMG in the Queen's Birthday Honours of 1964.

Publications
A History of Mexico, Hart-Davis, London, 1970. 
Mexico: A Short History, Crowell, New York, 1971. 
New Spain: the birth of modern Mexico, Gollancz, London, 1974. 
Mediaeval Greece, Yale University Press, 1981. 
Keepers of the Keys: the Pope in history, Macdonald, London, 1982. 
A history of the popes, Dorset Press, 1992.

References
CHEETHAM, Sir Nicolas (John Alexander), Who Was Who, A & C Black, 1920–2007; online edn, Oxford University Press, December 2012.
"Sir Nicolas Cheetham: Diplomat who remained unruffled by the icy exchanges of the early Cold War years" (obituary), The Times, London, 13 February 2002, p. 3.

External links

1910 births
2002 deaths
People educated at Eton College
Alumni of Christ Church, Oxford
Ambassadors of the United Kingdom to Hungary
Ambassadors of the United Kingdom to Mexico
20th-century British historians
Knights Commander of the Order of St Michael and St George